Maulusmuhle railway station was a railway station serving Maulusmuhle, in the commune of Weiswampach, in northern Luxembourg.  It was operated by the Société Nationale des Chemins de Fer Luxembourgeois, the state-owned railway company.

The station was situated on Line 10, which connects Luxembourg City to the centre and north of the country, between Clervaux and Troisvierges. It was closed on 14 December 2014.

External links

 Official CFL page on Maulusmuhle station
 Rail.lu page on Maulusmuhle station

Weiswampach
Railway stations in Luxembourg
Railway stations on CFL Line 10